The Ministry of Local Administration and Environment is a department of the Council of Ministers of the Syrian Arab Republic.

History 
The history of the Ministry of Local Administration goes back to the first government during the era of Hafez al-Assad, and this journey began by Jabr al-Kafri in March 1972. The ministry continued as it was until the end of 2001 when the Ministry of State for Environmental Affairs was added to it and entrusted to the engineer Hilal al-Atrash.

Legislative Decree 64 of 2004 stipulated that the term Ministry of Local Administration and Environment should replace the Ministry of Housing and Construction. The third article of the decree stipulates that “the workers in the Ministry of Housing and Construction who are on the job in the Directorates of Urban Planning and Topography shall be deemed to be transferred by law to the Ministry of Local Administration and Environment”.

In April 2009, Decree No. 25 was issued to dismiss the ministry and create a Ministry of State for Environmental Affairs to assume the tasks and competencies that were assumed by the Ministry of Local Administration and Environment in accordance with the legislation and regulations in force with regard to environmental affairs. The name of the Ministry of Local Administration and Environment was amended to become the Ministry of Local Administration.

The Ministry in its current form was created in 2016 by a presidential decree (Law No. 18) merging both the Ministry of Local Administration and the Ministry of State for Environmental Affairs. It is managed by Eng. Hussein Makhlouf since July 31, 2016.

Responsibility 
Through the Local Administration Law, the concerned ministry is responsible for: 
 Securing services for citizens
 Community cohesion 
 Decentralization
 Local government
 Planning
 Environment
 Reconstruction
 Urban regeneration
 General policy of state

Organisation

Ministry directorates

Minister's Office Directorate

Assistant Minister's Office

 Directorate of Institutions and Companies
 Directorate of Press and Information
 Directorate of Administrative Affairs
 Directorate of Planning and Statistics
 Directorate of Local Councils Affairs
 Directorate of Personnel Affairs
 Directorate of Financial Affairs
 Legal Department
 Department of Studies and Contracts
 Directorate of Internal Control
 Administrative Development Directorate
 Directorate of Fire and Disaster Affairs
 The tasks of the Informatics Directorate
 Technical Affairs Directorate
 Follow-up and Complaints Directorate
 Directorate of Service Systems and Schemes
 Directorate of Mechanisms
 Directorate of Real Estate Affairs
 Directorate of International Cooperation
 Technical Department

Environmental Directorates 
 Directorate of Renewable Energy and Cleaner Production 
 Directorate of Water Safety
 Environmental Awareness Directorate
 Atmospheric Safety Directorate
 Directorate of Biodiversity, Lands and Reserves
 Directorate of Environmental Impact Assessment
 Environmental Research Directorate
 Safety Directorate

Affiliates 
 General Directorate of Real Estate Interests
 Inland transportation companies
 Citizen service centers
 Reconstruction Committee
 Relief Committee

See also 
 Government ministries of Syria

References

External links 
 Official Page of Ministry

Local government ministries
Ministries established in 2016
Government ministers of Syria
Environment ministries
Cabinet of Syria
Lists of political office-holders in Syria
2016 establishments in Syria
Coordinates not on Wikidata